This is a list of Ukrainian football transfers in the winter transfer window 2014-2015 by club. Only transfers of the Premier League are included.

Premier League

Chornomorets Odesa

In:

Out:

Dnipro Dnipropetrovsk

In:

Out:

See also
2014-15 Ukrainian Premier League

References

External links
 Ukrainian Football Premier League- official site
 Professional football league of Ukraine - official site
 Football Federation of Ukraine - official site

Ukrainian
Transfers
2014-15